The Swedish Society for Anthropology and Geography (SSAG) is a scientific learned society founded in December 1877. It was established after a rearrangement of various sections of the Anthropological Society, which was formed in 1873 by Hjalmar Stolpe, Hans Hildebrand, Oscar Montelius, and Gustaf Retzius.

The society functions as a link between science and the public, especially in the subjects of anthropology and geography. It awards research fellowships, organizes excursions and lectures, and hands out awards including the Vega Medal and Retzius Medal. In 1880, the society published the first edition of the Swedish yearbook Ymer, and it has published the international journal Geografiska Annaler since 1919, a publication that is divided between physical geography and human geography.

In 2018, it established Kritisk Etnografi, an academic journal of ethnography.

Society awards 
The society created the Vega Medal in 1881, on the occasion of Adolf Erik Nordenskiöld's return to Stockholm after the Vega expedition – his discovery of the Northeast Passage. Since then, the Vega Medal has been awarded to an outstanding physical geographer roughly every three years. In the intervening years, the society has awarded the Anders Retzius Medal to a geographer or anthropologist.

In 2015, the Society decided that awarding a medal named after Retzius was inappropriate; his racial studies—including a collection of skulls of indigenous peoples—are viewed with disapproval by modern anthropologists. Thereafter, the Retzius Medal was renamed the SSAG medal, and it was given to Didier Fassin in 2016. The society's awards are handed out by the King of Sweden on 24 April, the anniversary of Nordenskiöld's return to Stockholm.

Recipients 
The following people are among the recipients of the society's awards:

Vega Medal 

 1881: Adolf Erik Nordenskiöld
 1882: Louis Palander
 1883: Henry Morton Stanley
 1884: Nikolai Przhevalsky
 1888: Wilhelm Junker
 1889: Fridtjof Nansen
 1890: Emin Pasha
 1892: Louis Gustave Binger
 1897: Otto Sverdrup
 1898: Sven Hedin
 1899: Georg August Schweinfurth
 1900: Alfred Gabriel Nathorst
 1901: Prince Luigi Amedeo
 1903: Ferdinand von Richthofen
 1904: Otto Nordenskiöld
  Johan G. Andersson
 1905: Robert Falcon Scott
 1907: Otto Pettersson
 1909: Johan Peter Koch
 1910: Ernest Shackleton
 1912: John Murray
 1913: Roald Amundsen
 1915: Gerard De Geer
 1919: Knud Johan Victor Rasmussen
 1920: William Morris Davis
 1922: Albert I, Prince of Monaco
 1923: Albrecht Penck
 1924: Lauge Koch
 1926: Boris Vilkitsky
 1930: Harald Sverdrup
 1931: Émile-Félix Gautier
 1932: Albert Defant
 1937: Roy Chapman Andrews
 1939: Vilhelm Bjerknes
  Vagn W. Ekman
 1941: Bjørn Helland-Hansen
  Hans W. Ahlmann
 1944: Lennart von Post
 1946: Emmanuel de Martonne
 1948: Richard Evelyn Byrd
 1950: Hans Pettersson
 1951: Carl Troll
 1954: Laurence Dudley Stamp
 1955: Paul-Émile Victor
 1957: Carl O. Sauer
 1958: Jacob Bjerknes
  Tor Bergeron
 1959: Mikhail Somov
 1961: Richard Joel Russell
 1962: Thor Heyerdahl
 1963: Louis Leakey
 1965: Maurice Ewing
 1970: Filip Hjulström
  Sigurður Þórarinsson
 1972: Albert P. Crary
 1975: Willi Dansgaard
 1981: Valter Schytt
 1983: Cesare Emiliani
 1984: Hubert Lamb
 1986: John Ross Mackay
 1987: Gunnar Hoppe
  Åke Sundborg
 1990: George H. Denton
 1993: David E. Sugden
 1994: Gösta Hjalmar Liljequist
 1997: Albert Lincoln Washburn
 1999: John Imbrie
 2002: Lonnie Thompson
 2005: Françoise Gasse
 2008: Dorthe Dahl-Jensen
 2011: Terry Callaghan
 2014: Compton J. Tucker
 2015: Lesley Head
 2017: Yao Tandong
 2018: Gillian Hart
 2020: David R. Montgomery
 2021: Anssi Paasi

Retzius Medal 

 1913: Oscar Montelius
 1920: Arthur Evans
 1923: Aurel Stein
 1925: Johan Gunnar Andersson
 1930: Erland Nordenskiöld
 1967: Walter Christaller
 1969: David Hannerberg
 1973: Torsten Hägerstrand
 1976: William William-Olsson
 1978: Wolfgang Hartke
 1985: Akin Mabogunje
 1988: Fredrik Barth
 1989: David Harvey
  Sven Godlund
 1991: Allan Pred
 1992: Jack Goody
 1994: Peter Haggett
 1995: Veena Das
 1997: Peter Gould
 1998: David Maybury-Lewis
 2000: Erik Bylund
 2001: Sherry Ortner
 2003: Doreen Massey
 2004: Tim Ingold
 2006: Gunnar Törnqvist
 2007: John and Jean Comaroff
 2009: Allen J. Scott
 2010: Ulf Hannerz
 2012: Don Mitchell
 2013: Paul Stoller

Gold Medal 

 2016: Didier Fassin
 2019: Emily Martin
 2022: Thomas Hylland Eriksen

Kritisk Etnografi 

Kritisk Etnografi (Swedish for "critical ethnography"), subtitled Swedish Journal of Anthropology, is a bi-annual peer-reviewed, open-access, online-only, academic journal on the subjects of anthropology and ethnography, owned and published by the Swedish Society for Anthropology and Geography in collaboration with DiVA, an online archive maintained by Uppsala University. Its first issue was launched on 15 August 2018.

See also 
 List of geographical societies
 List of anthropology awards
 List of geography awards

References

Footnotes

Sources

External links 
  
 
 

1877 establishments in Sweden
Anthropology-related professional associations
Geographic societies
Anthropology and Geography
Scientific organizations established in 1877